This was the first edition of the event.

Wang Qiang won the title, defeating Yuliya Beygelzimer in the final, 6–1, 6–3.

Seeds

Draw

Finals

Top half

Bottom half

References 
 Main Draw

2014 ITF Women's Circuit
2014 in Indian tennis